The 2017–18 Navy Midshipmen men's basketball team represented the United States Naval Academy during the 2017–18 NCAA Division I men's basketball season. The Midshipmen, led by seventh-year head coach Ed DeChellis, played their home games at Alumni Hall in Annapolis, Maryland as members of the Patriot League. They finished the season 20–12, 11–7 in Patriot League play to finish in a tie for third place. They lost in the quarterfinals of the Patriot League tournament to Holy Cross.

Previous season
The Midshipmen finished the 2016–17 season 16–16, 10–8 in Patriot League play to finish in fourth place. In the Patriot League tournament, they defeated Holy Cross in the quarterfinals before losing to top-seeded Bucknell in the semifinals.

Roster

Schedule and results

|-
!colspan=9 style=| Non-conference regular season

|-
!colspan=9 style=| Patriot League regular season

|-
!colspan=9 style=| Patriot League tournament

References

Navy Midshipmen men's basketball seasons
Navy
Navy
Navy